Denmark competed at the 1924 Summer Olympics in Paris, France. 89 competitors, 78 men and 11 women, took part in 60 events in 13 sports.

Medalists

Athletics

Nine athletes represented Denmark in 1924. It was the nation's sixth appearance in the sport as well as the Games. Petersen's fourth-place finish in the pole vault was the best result for the Danish athletes in Paris.

Ranks given are within the heat.

Boxing 

Eight boxers represented Denmark at the 1924 Games. It was the nation's third appearance in the sport. Hans Jacob Nielsen became the first Danish Olympic champion in boxing after moving up from featherweight in 1920 to lightweight in 1924. Soren Petersen repeated as the silver medalist in the top weight class, while Thyge Petersen added another silver in the light heavyweight.

Cycling

Six cyclists represented Denmark in 1924. It was the nation's third appearance in the sport. The Hansens won Denmark's first Olympic cycling medal, with a silver in the tandem competition.

Road cycling

Ranks given are within the heat.

Track cycling

Ranks given are within the heat.

Diving

Four divers represented Denmark in 1924. It was the nation's second appearance in the sport.

Ranks given are within the heat.

 Men

 Women

Equestrian

A single equestrian represented Denmark in 1924. It was the nation's second appearance in the sport, and first since 1912. Kirkebjerg, who was on the 1912 team as well, won the silver medal in the eventing competition to earn Denmark's first Olympic equestrian medal.

Fencing

Eleven fencers, seven men and four women, represented Denmark in 1924. It was the nation's sixth appearance in the sport as well as the Games; Denmark had competed in fencing more often than any other country. Denmark was one of nine countries to enter women in the first Olympic women's fencing event; Danish women took the gold and bronze medals in that event. Ellen Osiier won the women's foil, becoming the first Olympic champion in women's fencing. The Danish men were not as successful, taking no medals in their six events.

 Men

Ranks given are within the pool.

 Women

Ranks given are within the pool.

Modern pentathlon

Three pentathletes represented Denmark in 1924. It was the nation's third appearance in the sport. Denmark was one of six nations to have competed in each edition of the Olympic modern pentathlon.

Sailing

Four sailors represented Denmark in 1924. It was the nation's second appearance in the sport. The 6 metre class boat took silver, matching the nation's previous best result in sailing.

Shooting

Seven sport shooters represented Denmark in 1924. It was the nation's sixth appearance in the sport as well as the Games; Denmark was one of three nations (along with France and Great Britain) to have competed in each Olympic sport shooting competition. Larsen took the bronze in the 600 metre free rifle for Denmark's only shooting medal in 1924.

Swimming

Ranks given are within the heat.

 Women

Tennis

 Men

 Women

 Mixed

Wrestling

Freestyle wrestling

 Men's

Greco-Roman

 Men's

Art Competitions

References

External links
Official Olympic Reports
International Olympic Committee results database

Nations at the 1924 Summer Olympics
1924
Olympics